Yonathan Wladimir Andía León (born August 6, 1992) is a Chilean footballer who currently plays for Chilean Primera División club Universidad de Chile as a right back.

Club career
A product of the Escuela de Fútbol (Football Academy) Benjamín Muñoz, he played for several amateur clubs like Club Deportivo Huertos La Perla at local championships and at the Tercera A and Tercera B, the fourth and the fifth level of the Chilean football, respectively, until he was seen by Víctor Rivero, manager of Unión La Calera from 2017 to 2018.

Unión La Calera
He arrived playing as central midfielder, but the coach Francisco Meneghini turned him on right back, being a recurring starting player, appearing also in Copa Sudamericana matches on 2019 and 2020.

Universidad de Chile
After being the runner-up at the Campeonato Nacional AFP PlanVital 2020 along with Unión La Calera, he signed with Universidad de Chile a three-year contract.

International career
He received his first call up to the Chile senior team for the 2022 World Cup qualifiers against Uruguay and Colombia in October 2020, but he made his international debut in a match against Peru on 13 November 2020.

Personal life
Andía is nicknamed Cachorro (Puppy) since he was a child, due to he used to attend to the local amateur matches along with his uncles surnamed León (Lion).

In July 2022, he was involved in legal issues due to that he was arrested after not respecting a red traffic light and drunk driving in La Florida, Santiago. His club, Universidad de Chile, applied him disciplinary bans.

References

External links
 

Living people
1992 births
People from Bío Bío Province
Chilean footballers
Chile international footballers
Unión Santa María footballers
General Velásquez footballers
Deportes Limache footballers
Unión La Calera footballers
Universidad de Chile footballers
Tercera División de Chile players
Chilean Primera División players
Association football defenders